Gabriella Wright (born 19 June 1982) is an English actress and model, best known for playing Queen Claude of France in the series The Tudors, Viola in the film The Perfect Husband, and Gina in the action thriller The Transporter Refueled. In addition to her acting and modeling careers, she is a humanitarian and activist with contributions to many international campaigns on gender-based violence and suicide prevention.

Early life 
Wright was born on 19 June 1982 in Stoke Newington, London to Paul David Wright, a sculptor and painter, and Anne Catherine Wright, a teacher and writer. Her siblings are Paulette and Pascal Wright. She moved to France with her parents at the age of 12, and graduated in English Literature and Social Economics. She currently resides in Los Angeles. 

Wright's acting coaches include Susan Batson and Jack Garfein.

Acting career 
In 2004, Wright played her first lead role, in the film One Dollar Curry, directed by Vijay Singh.

In 2007, Wright appeared as Queen Claude of France in the historical drama series The Tudors.

In 2014, Wright appeared in the 7th season of the HBO's supernatural drama series True Blood, in which she played the role of Sylvie. She played the lead role in the horror film The Perfect Husband along with Bret Roberts and Carl Wharton, directed by Lucas Pavetto.

In 2015 Wright appeared in the action thriller film The Transporter Refueled, directed by Camille Delamarre.

In 2016, Wright was cast in the film Security as Ruby, which stars Antonio Banderas and Ben Kingsley.

In 2018, Wright played Rebekha Volt in Action Team, a spy comedy spoof directed by James De Frond.

Wright played Veronika, the personal hitwoman for Antonio Banderas’s character in the 2021 American action comedy film, Hitman's Wife's Bodyguard, directed by Patrick Hughes.

Activism 
Wright's humanitarian engagement dates back to 2004. She is the founder of the production company Conscious Intent which supports different media formats to promote "the human story". 

In 2019, she produced ‘I am Never Alone’, directed by Michel Pascal, which was the impetus for the Never Alone global campaign, which she founded with Deepak Chopra. Also with Chopra, she contributed the series titled ‘Telepathy and Autism’ to a meditation and yoga application, Mind Dive, which she co-developed as a tool to reduce stress and relieve trauma through meditation, science, yoga and films.

She shares her meditation practice with parolees in the greater Los Angeles area, facilitated by the Amity Foundation. She is a goodwill ambassador to Skypower, a solar company with a socio-economic impact model for developing nations, and is the honorary president of a grassroots charity in Myanmar that works in slums in and around Yangon. 

As a motivational speaker, she advocates for an end to violence against women and girls and has lent her voice to UN Women and the UN Trust Fund to End Violence against Women in London (2018) and in Los Angeles (2019) with Nicole Kidman. She has been a guest speaker at the Difficult Dialogues forum (2018) which compared the ‘Me too‘ movements in India and Hollywood and has also spoken numerous times at Carnegie Hall on healing trauma, the power of meditation and how to seek fulfillment, irrespective of life circumstances. Her recent engagement featured a powerful story of a young woman survivor of violence from Zimbabwe, which she narrated at the opening of the First UN Trust Fund Grantee Convention held in Bosnia and Herzegovina on 24 October 24 2019, and a seminar on suicide prevention and self-awareness, which she delivered at Amrita Vishwa Vidyapeetham University in India on 3 January 2020.

Personal life 
Wright married producer Thierry Klemeniuk in 2005; they divorced in 2010.

Filmography

Film

Television

References

External links 
 
 

Living people
1982 births
People from Stoke Newington
Actresses from London
English film actresses
English television actresses
French film actresses
French television actresses
English female models
French female models
21st-century English actresses
21st-century French actresses